The Devil and Daniel Mouse is a 1978 Canadian animated Halloween television special, based on the 1936 short tale The Devil and Daniel Webster by Stephen Vincent Benét. The Devil and Daniel Mouse is the second television special produced by the Canadian animation firm Nelvana Ltd.

Plot
The story is about two struggling mouse musicians, Daniel and Jan. When they are fired from their latest gig (their music is deemed too old-fashioned and not with the times), Daniel goes to pawn his guitar in order to buy groceries. Jan wanders off on her own and encounters a shifty reptilian character in a white suit who introduces himself as "B.L. Zebub", a record producer.

He and his weasel assistant, Weez Weezel, offer her fame and fortune in exchange for signing a contract in her own blood. Jan does not read the fine print and trusts B.L., signing herself over to his record production company. Little does she suspect that B.L. is none other than the devil himself, and at midnight at the height of her fame, he will return to collect her soul. To assist her, Weez conjures three band members from thin air, a rabbit (Rabbit Delight), a beaver (Boom Boom Beaver), and a praying mantis (Pray Mantis).

As the lead singer of "Funky Jan and the Animal Kingdom", Jan is soon the most popular rock star on the planet, while the oblivious Daniel is left out in the cold. But when B.L. comes for her soul and she realizes what she has done, a distraught Jan goes to Daniel for help. A trial is held in the woods that night over Jan's soul, with Weez as the judge and Daniel acting as Jan's attorney. As an additional stipend, the Devil states that should Daniel lose the trial, his soul, as well as Jan's, will be taken as payment. At first, the trial seems hopeless, considering Daniel has no education as a lawyer and cannot present even the beginnings of a reasonable argument to release Jan.

Having nothing else to offer, Daniel begins to sing a heartfelt song. Jan joins in, as do her three heretofore unhelpful band members. The other animals watching the trial begin to sing and clap along to the tune and so do the jury of three lost souls (whom were multiplied three times into 12 by B.L. himself). An enraged devil attempts to summon forth demons to stop the heroes, but the spirits he conjures also fall prey to the sway of Daniel's music.

A frustrated devil finally leaves, returning to Hell and taking Weez and all of his other minions with him. The two mice embrace one another as the film ends.

Notes

Nelvana's polar bear logo made its first appearance at the end of the film. The polar bear was eventually used as a in-credit logo later in their specials from 1979 to 1980 and from after 1980 to 1988.

Cast

Songs
Look Where the Music Can Take You performed by John Sebastian & Valerie Carter (credited as Laurel Runn)
I've Got a Song to Sing performed by Valerie Carter (credited as Laurel Runn)
Roxy Marathon Concert Medley performed by Valerie Carter (credited as Laurel Runn)
Can You Help Me Find My Song? performed by Valerie Carter (credited as Laurel Runn)
Look Where the Music Can Take You performed by John Sebastian & Valerie Carter (credited as Laurel Runn)
Look Where the Music Can Take You (Finale) performed by John Sebastian & Valerie Carter (credited as Laurel Runn)

Merchandising

Nelvana story album
A tie-in story LP record was released by Nelvana Records in 1978.'  Narrated by John Sebastian, the album features dialog lifted straight from the film's soundtrack as well as songs performed by Sebastian, Valerie Carter (credited as Laurel Runn)  and the Reggie Knighton Band.  As in the film, the dialogue is interspersed with several of the songs.

Full-colour storybook
First published by Avon/Camelot in 1979, the storybook was written by screenwriter Ken Sobol and features music and lyrics for three John Sebastian penned songs (I've Got a Song, Can You Help Me Find My Song? and Look Where the Music Can Take You). Simplified for younger readers, many of the visual gags and a few scenes were omitted from the book.

Home video
The Devil and Daniel Mouse was simultaneously issued as a stand-alone title on Betamax and VHS as well as featured on several compilations of Nelvana's TV specials.

Nelvanamation (Volume 1) 
The first and more widely available compilation to feature the film was Nelvanamation (Volume 1).  Also featured on this video are Romie-0 and Julie-8, Intergalactic Thanksgiving and A Cosmic Christmas.

The Devil and Daniel Mouse and Tales of Fantasy and Science Fiction 
Headlining a collection similar to Nelvanamation, this CED Videodisc also includes Romie-0 and Julie-8, Easter Fever, Intergalactic Thanksgiving and A Cosmic Christmas.

Rock & Rule 
The Devil and Daniel Mouse became the inspiration for Nelvana's first feature film, Rock & Rule. The film and How We Made the Devil and Daniel Mouse, a vintage "making of" documentary, were both included on the two-DVD and Blu-ray versions of that film in a slightly edited form of 22 minutes from its original 25-minute running time.

In popular culture
Dialogue from this film was used by the rock band Bauhaus in the song "Party of the First Part", found on some versions of The Sky's Gone Out and 1989's Swing the Heartache: The BBC Sessions.

References

See also
1978 in television
Canadian animation

External links

  The 1978 special in its entirety on YouTube

1978 animated films
1978 films
1978 television specials
1970s animated short films
1970s animated television specials
Anthropomorphic animal characters
Canadian animated short films
Canadian television specials
Films directed by Clive A. Smith
Animated films about mice
The Devil in film
Halloween television specials
Daniel Mouse
Nelvana television specials
Television shows based on short fiction
1970s English-language films
1970s Canadian films